The 12th Senate District of Wisconsin is one of 33 districts in the Wisconsin State Senate.  Located in northern Wisconsin, the district comprises Florence, Forest, Langlade, Lincoln, Menominee, and Oneida counties, and most of Marinette, Oconto, and Vilas counties, as well as parts of northern Marathon County and Shawano County.

Current elected officials
Mary Felzkowski is the senator representing the 12th district.  She was first elected in the 2020 general election.  She previously served 8 years in the State Assembly.

Each Wisconsin State Senate district is composed of three Wisconsin State Assembly districts.  The 12th Senate district comprises the 34th, 35th, and 36th Assembly districts.  The current representatives of those districts are: 
 Assembly District 34: Rob Swearingen (R–Rhinelander)
 Assembly District 35: Calvin Callahan (R–Wilson)
 Assembly District 36: Jeffrey Mursau (R–Crivitz)

The 12th Senate district is split between two congressional districts.  The portion of the district in Florence, Forest, Langlade, Oneida, Vilas, Lincoln, and Marathon counties falls within the Wisconsin's 7th congressional district, which is represented by U.S. Representative Tom Tiffany; the remainder of the district, which falls within Marinette, Oconto, Menominee, and Shawano counties, is in Wisconsin's 8th congressional district, which is represented by U.S. Representative Mike Gallagher.

Past senators
Past senators include:

Note: the boundaries of the district has changed repeatedly over history. Previous politicians of this district have represented a completely different geographic area, due to redistricting.  The district definitions for the given era are specified in the "District definition" column.

Notes

External links
Jim Holperin for State Senate official campaign site

Wisconsin State Senate districts
Florence County, Wisconsin
Forest County, Wisconsin
Langlade County, Wisconsin
Lincoln County, Wisconsin
Marinette County, Wisconsin
Menominee County, Wisconsin
Oconto County, Wisconsin
Oneida County, Wisconsin
Shawano County, Wisconsin
Vilas County, Wisconsin
1848 establishments in Wisconsin